Martin Obst (born 18 November 1986) is a German freestyle wrestler. In 2018, he won the silver medal in the 79 kg event at the 2018 European Wrestling Championships held in Kaspiysk, Russia.

In 2015, he competed in the men's freestyle 74 kg event at the 2015 World Wrestling Championships held in Las Vegas, United States. In 2018, he competed in the men's freestyle 79 kg event at the 2018 World Wrestling Championships held in Budapest, Hungary.

Major results

References

External links 
 

Living people
1986 births
Place of birth missing (living people)
German male sport wrestlers
European Wrestling Championships medalists
20th-century German people
21st-century German people